60 Minutes Sports is a newsmagazine that aired on Showtime from January 2013 to March 2017. It was a spin-off of 60 Minutes, a program aired by Showtime's parent network CBS, with a focus on sport-related topics, interviews with notable figures, and sports-related stories from the archives of 60 Minutes. The series also featured contributions from CBS Sports personalities.

CBS News chairman Jeff Fager stated that the program would "offer the same high-quality, original reporting and great storytelling our viewers have come to expect every Sunday night on CBS"; the premiere episode featured a story on Lance Armstrong's doping scandal, an interview with Lionel Messi, and an update to a past story on Alex Honnold. The Los Angeles Times noted that the series was likely intended as a competitor to Real Sports, a similar sports newsmagazine broadcast by HBO.

In January 2017, a CBS News spokesperson confirmed to TVNewser that 60 Minutes Sports had been cancelled. Its final episode aired on March 7, 2017.

On May 26, 2020 as schedule filler due to the COVID-19 pandemic, CBS announced that it would air a six-episode compilation of 60 Minutes Sports segments on weekend afternoons from May 30 to June 14, under the title 60 Minutes Sports: Timeless Stories.

References

2013 American television series debuts
2017 American television series endings
CBS News
Television series by CBS Studios
Current affairs shows
60 Minutes
English-language television shows
Showtime (TV network) original programming
American sports television series
2010s American television news shows
American television spin-offs